1:1 may refer to:
 1:1 scale
 1:1 correspondence, the same as a set-theoretical bijection
 1:1 line in a 2-dimensional Cartesian coordinates
 1:1 aspect ratio (image), the square format
 1:1 pixel mapping
 1:1 (film), an animated film by Richard Reeves (2001)
 One to one computing (education)
 Koenigsegg One:1, a model of the Koenigsegg Agera sports car

See also 
 1-1 (disambiguation)
 One-to-one (disambiguation)